Atagema anceps is a species of sea slug or dorid nudibranch, a marine gastropod mollusc in the family Discodorididae.

Distribution 
This species has been reported from the Caribbean Sea.

References

External links

Discodorididae
Gastropods described in 1890